The 2015 FEI World Cup Finals in Las Vegas will held between April 15 to April 19, 2015. It will be the final of the Show jumping and Dressage World Cup series. The finals will be held at the Thomas & Mack Center. For the first time since 2009 Show Jumping and Dressage World Cup Finals will be held in the United States.

Dressage

Qualification 

* qualified on reallocation
** received a wild card after Valentina Truppa withdrew

Agenda and results

Show jumping

Qualification 

* extra competitor (Extra competitors are riders, who live in a country, which is not part of the World Cup League of the country of this riders nationality. These riders are at first part of the World Cup League of the country in which they live. At the end of the season this riders deducted from the final score of this league. If they have just as many or more points as the last qualified rider, they have the chance to start at the World Cup Final).
** qualified on reallocation

Agenda and results

External links 
 Website of the 2015 FEI World Cup Finals (English)

References 

2015 in equestrian
Dressage World Cup
Show Jumping World Cup
Sports competitions in the Las Vegas Valley
Equestrian sports competitions in the United States
International sports competitions hosted by the United States